Statistics of Bulgarian Republic Football Championship in the 1947 season.

Overview
It was contested by 16 teams, and Levski Sofia won the championship.

First round

|-
!colspan="3" style="background-color:#D0F0C0; text-align:left;" |Replay

|}

Quarter-finals

|}

Semi-finals

|}

Final

First game

Second game

Levski Sofia won 2–1 on aggregate.

References
Bulgaria - List of final tables (RSSSF)

Bulgarian Republic Football Championship seasons
1
1